Ashik Aghasi (also Romanized as Āshīk Āghāsī) is a village in Khotbeh Sara Rural District, Kargan Rud District, Talesh County, Gilan Province, Iran. At the 2006 census, its population was 1,181, in 325 families.

References 

Populated places in Talesh County